Naseerabad may refer to:

 Naseerabad (Karachi), a suburb of Gulberg Town in Karachi, Sindh, Pakistan
 Naseerabad, Balochistan, a city in Naseerabad District in Balochistan, Pakistan
 Naseerabad District, a district in Naseerabad Division in Balochistan, Pakistan
 Naseerabad Division, an administrative division in Balochistan, Pakistan
 Naseerabad Basti, Basti in Muzaffargarh, Pakistan

See also
 Nasirabad (disambiguation)
 Nasrabad (disambiguation)